Metro Cinema may refer to:
 Metro Cinema (Derby), closed 2008
 Metro Cinema (Mumbai) 1938–2006 name, now Metro BIG Cinemas, Mumbai
 Metro Cinema (Kolkata), a single screen movie theatre in Kolkata (formerly Calcutta)
 Metro Cinema Edmonton, a non-profit organization and registered charity located in Edmonton, Alberta, Canada
 The former Minerva Theatre, Sydney, which was renamed Metro Cinema in 1950